The petrochemical industry is concerned with the production and trade of petrochemicals. A major part is constituted by the plastics (polymer) industry. It directly interfaces with the petroleum industry, especially the downstream sector.

Companies
The top ten global petrochemical companies based on the 2008 revenues – excludes state-owned companies:

Countries and sites
Marun petrochemical complex

Technology

Conferences
Asia Petrochemical Industry Conference
International Petrochemical Conference by the AFPM

Associations
American Fuel and Petrochemical Manufacturers (AFPM)
European Petrochemical Association
Gulf Petrochemicals and Chemicals Association

Awards
Medal "For the Tapping of the Subsoil and Expansion of the Petrochemical Complex of Western Siberia"
Petrochemical Heritage Award

See also
Aqueous Wastes from Petroleum and Petrochemical Plants

References

 
Industries (economics)